Jama Masjid (also called Jami Masjid) is a historic mosque in Mandu in the Central Indian state of Madhya Pradesh. Built in Mughal style of architecture, the mosque has been believed to have been built during the reign of Hoshang Shah and completed during the reign of Mahmud Khilji in 1454. 

The Masjid has three large domes, a courtyard, 54 smaller domes and colonnade of pillared halls. It has a prayer hall and decorated pillars in the masjid. The inscriptions on the eastern doorway to the porch indicates that the mosque was modeled on the basis of Mosque of Damascus. In modern times, the Group of Monuments at Mandu is maintained and administered by the Bhopal circle of the Archaeological Survey of India.

Mandu is one of the prime tourist destinations of the state of Madhya Pradesh. Along with the other monuments, the average number of visitors a day to the monument stands at 4,000 to 5,000 as of 2020. There are annual shows organized in the monument by the Tourism Department of Madhya Pradesh.

History
When Timur captured Delhi in 1401, the Afghan Dilawar Khan, governor of Malwa, set up his own little kingdom and the Ghuri dynasty was established, His son, Hoshang Shah, shifted the capital from Dhar to Mandu and raised it to its greatest splendour. Mohammed Khalji established the Khalji dynasty of Malwa (1436-1531) and went on to rule for the next 33 years. However, it was under his reign that the Malwa Sultanate reached its greatest height. The mosque is built in Moghul style of architecture and been believed to have been built during the reign of Hoshang Shah and completed during the reign of Mahmud Khilji in 1454. Mahmud Khilji killed his father at the age of 55 and became the king of Mandu. It is believed that he had a harem of 15,000 women and he had a great penchant for art. The western wall contains lovely design and carving measuring 17 inches. In modern times, the 
Group of Monuments at Mandu is maintained and administered by the Bhopal circle of the Archaeological Survey of India.

Architecture

The fort is one of the finest examples of Afghan architecture in India.
The main entrance of the mosque is through the eastern entrance. The inscriptions on the eastern doorway to the porch indicates that the mosque was modeled on the basis of Mosque of Damascus. The doorway also has marble jambs and lintels which are atypical of Hindu structures. The entry via eastern entrance leads to a large courtyard interspersed with colonnaded verandas on the three sides. The pillared verandas leads to the prayer halls which is covered with pillars  with 58 small domes and three large domes. The prayer hall is full of arches. The central altar (called mihrab) is decorated with verses from Quran. The raised pulpit at the centre has a miniature pulpit made of marble. There are two entrances in the northern wall, one leading to the courtyard and other to the prayer hall.

In popular culture
Mandu is one of the prime tourist destinations of the state of Madhya Pradesh. Along with the other monuments, the average number of visitors a day to the monument stands at 4,000 to 5,000 as of 2020. As per the report from the authorities, the footfall during 2019-20 was 3.79 lakhs and suffered a drop of 50% due to covid pandemic in 2020. During January 2020, a six-day Mandu Festival was conducted by E-Factor Entertainment (P) Ltd along with Madhya Pradesh Tourism to showcase various monuments of the city including the Masjid, which was held as the major highlight. The Jami Masjid is considered as the most majestic building and prime tourist destinations in the town.

References

External links

Mosques in Madhya Pradesh
Mandu
Indo-Islamic architecture